The East Bay Monthly is the largest circulation magazine in the East Bay area of California. The magazine bears many similarities to altweeklies in its distribution method, lack of cost to the consumer, newsprint pages and general size, which is roughly tabloid. It is also available by paid subscription. The Monthly (as it generally refers to itself) was founded in 1970 and, according to their website, distributes over 81,000 copies per month of its publication. It is primarily concerned with local cultural matters and frequently interviews local authors, artists and academics.

External links
Basic information as released by The East Bay Monthly
The East Bay Monthly's official Facebook page as released by The East Bay Monthly

Monthly magazines published in the United States
Local interest magazines published in the United States
Magazines established in 1970
Magazines published in the San Francisco Bay Area